Barbara L. Lukermann (February 19, 1930 – March 23, 2009) was a teacher and a fellow at the Humphrey Institute. She also led the Metropolitan Waste Control Commission.

Personal life
Born in Gomersal, England, on February 19, 1930, Lukermann was inspired to go into geography studies by a grammar school teacher. She moved to the United States in the mid-1950s to pursue a graduate degree. She earned an undergraduate degree from Cambridge University and eventually enrolled at the University of Minnesota, said at the time to have one of the best geography departments in the country.

Public service
Lukermann, considered a pioneer in urban planning, joined the Hubert H. Humphrey Institute in 1982 and was there until 2008. She was a teacher and a senior fellow in the institute's planning program.

Lukermann also was a senior research associate with the university's Center for Urban and Regional Affairs. She was a former chairwoman of the Metropolitan Waste Control Commission and a board member at St. Paul District Energy, and was president of the Citizens League.

Lukermann had a national and international reputation, traveling to China and Romania in the 1980s to make presentations. She also served as part of a federal advisory group that helped the Navajo Nation with urban planning.

Sources
Barbara Lukermann, urban planning pioneer | StarTribune.com
Barbara Lukermann Obituary - Saint Paul, MN | Pioneer Press
CTS - Publications: CTS Report - May 2009 : In memoriam: Barbara Lukermann
Development - Giving to the Institute - U of MN Humphrey Institute

American urban planners
Women urban planners
1930 births
University of Minnesota alumni
2009 deaths
People from Gomersal